Pitakotte West Grama Niladhari Division is a Grama Niladhari Division of the Sri Jayawardanapura Kotte Divisional Secretariat  of Colombo District  of Western Province, Sri Lanka .  It has Grama Niladhari Division Code 522.

Ananda Balika Vidyalaya, Kotte, Kotte Museum, Pita Kotte Gal Ambalama and Ananda Sastralaya, Kotte  are located within, nearby or associated with Pitakotte West.

Pitakotte West is a surrounded by the Ethulkotte, Pitakotte, Pagoda East, Pagoda, Nawala East, Koswatta and Ethulkotte West  Grama Niladhari Divisions.

Demographics

Ethnicity 

The Pitakotte West Grama Niladhari Division has a Sinhalese majority (89.5%) . In comparison, the Sri Jayawardanapura Kotte Divisional Secretariat (which contains the Pitakotte West Grama Niladhari Division) has a Sinhalese majority (84.8%)

Religion 

The Pitakotte West Grama Niladhari Division has a Buddhist majority (76.6%) . In comparison, the Sri Jayawardanapura Kotte Divisional Secretariat (which contains the Pitakotte West Grama Niladhari Division) has a Buddhist majority (77.1%)

Gallery

References 

Grama Niladhari Divisions of Kotte Divisional Secretariat